Footboard may refer to:
 Footboard (furniture) of a bed frame
 Running board of a vehicle
 Skateboard deck
 Footplate of a bass drum pedal

See also 
 Board foot, a unit of volume